"Potremmo ritornare" is a pop song written by Italian pop singer Tiziano Ferro. It was released as the first single from his sixth album Il mestiere della vita (2016) and achieved success in Italy, where it was certified double platinum by the Federation of the Italian Music Industry.

A Spanish-language version of the song was also released. Titled "Podríamos Regresar", it served as the first single from El Oficio de la  Vida, the Spanish edition of Ferro's sixth studio album.

Background and release
Considered by the artist as the heir to Alla mia età, it was composed by Ferro in collaboration with Michael Tenisci (songwriter, along with Tiziano, of the song "La vita in un anno", written for Alessandra Amoroso and contained in the album Vivere a colori of 2016) and it is dedicated to a woman that the singer and composer has no more at his side; for his writing, Tiziano was inspired by the text by Non escludo il ritorno of Franco Califano. About the song, Ferro said:

In a world that is used to high volume and has no more time to listen to anyone, I answered in a low voice. With a song that speaks of those who at some point need to draw conclusions. Look around. Everything takes shape at the beginning of a new chapter. Who goes and who "could come back"

The song was adapted in Spanish by Diego Galindo Martinez with the title "Podríamos regresar" and released as the first single in Spain on January 20, 2017 from the album  El Oficio de la Vida .

Music video
The music video (in Italian and Spanish) was directed by Gaetano Morbioli and shot in California. The singer is filmed in black and white while walking on stretches of sand (Desert Becker and Desert Dunes) and while walking barefoot by the sea (Laguna Beach).

On October 28, 2016, the same day of the publication of the single, the relative "making of" of the piece was made available on the YouTube channel of the Vevo profile of the artist. On 20 January 2017, the videoclip of Podríamos regresar was published on YouTube.

Track listing
Digital download (Italy)
"Potremmo ritornare" – 3:29

Digital download (Spain)
"Podríamos Regresar" – 3:27

7" (Only in Italy)
 7" vinyl
 "Potremmo ritornare"  – 3:31
 "Potremmo ritornare (instrumental)" – 3:31

Charts

Weekly positions

Year-end charts

Certifications

References

External links
 Tiziano ferro official website
 "Potremmo ritornare" Official Music video

2016 singles
Italian-language songs
Tiziano Ferro songs
Songs written by Tiziano Ferro
2016 songs
Number-one singles in Italy
Song recordings produced by Michele Canova